W. T. "Dub" Robinson (October 6, 1912 – December 14, 1987) was the head men’s tennis coach at Louisiana State University.

Coaching career
Robinson succeeded Mike Donahue at LSU and had a record of 173–173–9 from 1948 to 1974. He returned to coach the Tigers for one season in 1979, replacing his first successor, Steve Carter. The Tigers finished 16-7 in 1979, leaving Robinson with an overall record of 189–180–9 in 28 seasons as head coach. His teams finished as SEC runner-up four times. He was succeeded by Steve Strome in 1980. LSU named its tennis stadium, W.T. "Dub" Robinson Stadium (1976–2014), after Dub Robinson.

Personal life
Dub's youngest son, Johnny Robinson, is a former American football all-star safety who graduated from Louisiana State University and later played for the American Football League's Dallas Texans-Kansas City Chiefs.

References

External links
obituary

American tennis coaches
LSU Tigers tennis coaches
LSU Tigers boxers
Louisiana State University alumni
1912 births
1987 deaths